From the Vine is a 2019 Canadian drama film, directed by Sean Cisterna. Based on the novel Finding Marco by Kenneth Canio Cancellara, the film stars Joe Pantoliano as Marco Gentile, a burned-out business executive from Toronto who gives up on the corporate rat race, and moves his family to Italy to revive his grandfather's vineyard in Acerenza.

The film also stars Wendy Crewson as Marco's wife Marina and Paula Brancati as their daughter Laura, as well as Marco Leonardi, Tony Nardi, Tony Nappo, Kevin Hanchard and Frank Moore in supporting roles.

The film premiered in June 2019 at the Italian Contemporary Film Festival in Toronto, and subsequently received other film festival screenings through the summer, although its October screening at Devour! The Food Film Fest was billed as its official North American premiere.

The film was originally scheduled to enter commercial release on May 1, 2020, although this was cancelled due to the impact of the COVID-19 pandemic in Canada. It was instead released on digital platforms in July 2020.

Premise
A downtrodden man experiences an ethical crisis and travels back to his hometown in rural Italy to recalibrate his moral compass.

Cast
 Joe Pantoliano as Marco Gentile
Michele Stefanile as Young Marco Gentile
 Wendy Crewson as Marina Gentile
 Paula Brancati as Laura Gentile
 Marco Leonardi as Luca
 Tony Nardi as Marcello
 Tony Nappo as Enzo
 Franco Lo Presti as Gio
 Kevin Hanchard as John
 Rita del Piano as Amelia
 Sonia Dhillon Tully as Barbara Cavendish
 Frank Moore as Gordon Welsh
 Blu Lepore as Customs Agent
 Kenneth Canio Cancellara as Train Conductor

References

External links
 
 

2019 films
Canadian drama films
English-language Canadian films
Italian-language Canadian films
Films shot in Toronto
Films shot in Italy
Films set in Toronto
Films set in Basilicata
Films based on Canadian novels
Films not released in theaters due to the COVID-19 pandemic
Films directed by Sean Cisterna
2010s Canadian films